Koskelo is a Finnish surname. Notable people with the surname include:

 Juho Koskelo (1870–1942), Finnish-American singer and cellist
 Kaarlo Koskelo (1888–1953), Finnish wrestler
 Pauliine Koskelo (born 1956), President of the Supreme Court of Finland

Finnish-language surnames